Staroshakhovo (İśke Şax) is a rural locality (a selo) in Usman-Tashlinsky Selsoviet, Yermekeyevsky District, Bashkortostan, Russia. The population was 419 as of 2010. There are 4 streets.

Geography 
Staroshakhovo is located 29 km north of Yermekeyevo (the district's administrative centre) by road. Usman-Tashly is the nearest rural locality.

References 

Rural localities in Yermekeyevsky District